Claude Zidi (born 25 July 1934) is a French film director and screenwriter noted for his mainstream burlesque comedies. Born in Paris, he started as a cameraman and then a cinematographer, and he made his directorial and screenwriting debut in 1971. He won the César Award for Best Director for My New Partner, for which he was also nominated for Best Writing.

Filmography as director

External links 

1934 births
Living people
French male screenwriters
French screenwriters
Film directors from Paris
Best Director César Award winners
French people of Algerian descent